Anoxynatronum  is a Gram-positive, non-spore-forming and moderately alkaliphilic bacterial genus from the family of Clostridiaceae, with one known species (Anoxynatronum sibiricum).

References

Further reading 
 

Clostridiaceae
Monotypic bacteria genera
Bacteria genera
Alkaliphiles